Dyrnes is a village in Smøla Municipality in Møre og Romsdal county, Norway.  It is located on the northwestern part of the island of Smøla, just east of the village of Råket, and southwest of the village of Veiholmen.  The Smøla Wind Farm is located southeast of the village.

Together with the nearby village Råket it constituted the urban area Dyrnesvågen, which had a population in 2003 of 257. Since 2004, Dyrnesvågen has not considered an urban settlement by Statistics Norway, and its data is therefore not registered.

References

Smøla
Villages in Møre og Romsdal